GMPI may refer to:
 Generalized Music Plug-in Interface
 Global Marshall Plan Initiative